Dysdera apenninica is a spider species found in Italy.

See also 
 List of Dysderidae species

References 

Dysderidae
Spiders of Europe
Spiders described in 1964